İsmail Hakkı Dümbüllü (1897, İstanbul - 5 November 1973, Istanbul), Turkish comedy actor.

He is the last representative of ortaoyunu (middle show) tradition in traditional Turkish theatre. and a major comedy actor in Turkish cinema.

Biography 
He was born in 1897 in Üsküdar Süleymanağa neighborhood of Istanbul. He is the son of Zeynel Abidin Efendi, one of Abdülhamid I's musketeers, and Fatma Azize Hanım. 

Dümbüllü İsmail worked with Bald Hasan Efendi, a master actor of comedy in the Turkish theatre, between 1917-1926 and learned the art of tulûat (traditional improvisational theater) from him.  No other actor who performs tulûat in master-apprentice relationship has been seen after Dümbüllü İsmail. He received the nickname of "Dümbüllü" by singing a canto titled "Dümbüllü".

In 1928, İsmail Hakkı Dümbüllü founded his own troupe with Tevfik İnce  in Istanbul, and he began touring Anatolia in 1922. The artist, who also performed in operettas such as "Ayşem", "Cebe Gitti" and "Bülbül", became the most famous name in traditional theater after the death of Naşit Özcan  and continued the tradition of the middle play on his own.

He started acting  in movies in 1947. He was the lead actor in a series of comedies: Dümbüllü Macera Peşinde (Dümbüllü in Search of Adventure, Şadan Kamil, 1948), Dümbüllü Sporcu (Dümbüllü the Sportsman, Seyf Havaeri, 1952), and Dümbüllü Tarzan (Dümbüllü Tarzan, Muharrem Gürses, 1954). Before start making films,  he played orta oyunu (middle show) and tulûat at TRT Istanbul Radio. His efforts in transferring orta oyunu plays to radio and cinema  was effective in making the art of traditional Turkish theater known by more people and ensuring the continuity of the orta oyunu  tradition.

Dümbüllü took over his teacher Bald Hasan Efendi's turban (kavuk), representing the orta oyunu  (middle show) and his fez, representing art of tuluat, and handed these two symbols to Münir Özkul in 1968. These two symbols continue to be passed on in a traditional ceremony among Turkish theater actors.

He died at November 5th, 1973 after a traffic accident.

References

External links
 
 Dümbüllü documentary at TRT (Turkish Radio TV) Archive (Turkish)

20th-century Turkish male actors
Turkish male stage actors
Turkish male film actors
Burials at Karacaahmet Cemetery
1973 deaths
Male actors from Istanbul
1897 births